Glyphodes duponti is a moth of the family Crambidae described by Joseph de Joannis in 1915. It is found in the Seychelles on La Digue and Marianne Island.

It has a wingspan of 28 mm.

References

External links
 "Glyphodes duponti de Joannis, 1915 - Lepidoptera Crambidae Pyraustinae - Seychelles". Forum Entomologi Italiani. images.

Moths described in 1915
Glyphodes
Fauna of Seychelles